Muddu Meena (Kannada: ಮುದ್ದು ಮೀನ) is a 1967 Indian Kannada film, directed by Y. R. Swamy and produced by S. Heerabai. The film stars Kalyan Kumar, Jayanthi, K. S. Ashwath and Narasimharaju in the lead roles. The film has musical score by G. K. Venkatesh and Upendra Kumar.

Cast
Kalyan Kumar
Jayanthi as Meena
K. S. Ashwath
Narasimharaju
M. P. Shankar

Soundtrack
The music was composed by Upendra Kumar.

References

External links
 

1967 films
1960s Kannada-language films
Films scored by G. K. Venkatesh
Films directed by Y. R. Swamy